Lourinhã is a municipality in the District of Lisbon, in the Oeste Subregion of Portugal. The population in 2011 was 25,735, in an area of 147.17 km². The seat of the municipality is the town of Lourinhã, with a population of 8,800 inhabitants.

The present Mayor is João Duarte, elected by the Socialist Party.

History
The name Lourinhã possibly originated in the period of Roman domination, when a villa was located in the area. The origin of the medieval village is linked to Jordan, a French knight who took part in the successful Siege of Lisbon in 1147. King Afonso Henriques granted Jordan the region of Lourinhã as fief and allowed him to grant a foral (letter of feudal rights) to its settlers in 1160. The name Lourinhã may be related to the origin of its feudal lord, since Jordan was from the Loire region in France.

The rights of Lourinhã were confirmed by letters of King Sancho I in 1218 and again by Afonso III in 1258. The parish of Lourinhã became one of the richest of the Lisbon Diocese, as reflected by its main church, a fine example of 14th-century Portuguese Gothic architecture. The Gothic works of the main church were sponsored by Lourenço Vicente, a Lourinhã-born Archbishop of Braga who received the village as a donation of King John I in 1384.

In the 16th century, the Franciscan monastery of Santo António (1598) and a Misericórdia Church and Charity (1586) were founded in Lourinhã. The Misericórdia (Mercy), a religious charity, now houses a museum with outstanding Renaissance paintings. The most important paintings are by the hand of a mysterious early 16th-century painter, dubbed the Master of Lourinhã (Mestre da Lourinhã).

Starting at the end of the 19th century, the infrastructure of the municipality was modernised with roads, canalised water and electric light, as well as improvements in the educational system. The economy depended mostly on agriculture and fishing. Tourism is an increasingly important source of revenue, due to the municipality's extensive, picturesque beaches and, more recently, by the paleontological remains from the eponymous Lourinhã Formation, which include fossilised bones, footprints, eggs and even embryos from Jurassic dinosaurs. Many of which can be seen nowadays at the local museum, Museu da Lourinhã.

Lourinhã, is one of the few brandy-making areas, besides Cognac, Armagnac and Jerez, that have received appellation status.

Civil parishes
Administratively, the municipality is divided into 8 civil parishes (freguesias):
 
 Lourinhã e Atalaia
 Miragaia e Marteleira
 Moita dos Ferreiros
 Reguengo Grande
 Ribamar
 Santa Bárbara
 São Bartolomeu dos Galegos e Moledo
 Vimeiro

Climate
Lourinhã has a Mediterranean climate with warm, dry summers and mild, wet winters. Temperatures are never too hot nor too cold.

Population

Beaches
Lourinhã has 12 km of coastline with several popular beaches.
Praia de Areal
Praia da Areia Branca
Praia do Caniçal
Praia de Paimogo 
Praia de Vale Frades
Praia de Porto das Barcas
Praia da Peralta

Paleontology
The area of Lourinhã is known by the Late Jurassic findings of dinosaurs and other fossils, and give the name for Lourinhã Formation. The Museu da Lourinhã holds the main dinosaur collection.

Notable people 
 Ana Jorge (born 1949) a pediatrician and a Portuguese politician
 Nuno Brás (born 1963) Bishop of Madeira
 Fernando Alexandre (born 1985) a Portuguese former footballer with 307 club caps

See also
 Nadrupe, a village situated in the parish of Lourinhã

References

External links

 Municipality official website

 
Towns in Portugal
Municipalities of Lisbon District